Quinn Gleason and Catherine Harrison are the defending champions, but both players chose not to participate.

Freya Christie and Ali Collins won the title, defeating Irene Burillo Escorihuela and Andrea Lázaro García in the final, 6–4, 6–1.

Seeds

Draw

Draw

References

External Links
Main Draw

GB Pro-Series Glasgow - Doubles